I'm Old Fashioned (The Astaire Variations) is a ballet made by New York City Ballet balletmaster Jerome Robbins to Morton Gould's adaptation of a theme by Jerome Kern, “I'm Old Fashioned,”  to a Fred Astaire and Rita Hayworth sequence from the film You Were Never Lovelier. The premiere took place on Thursday, June 16, 1983, at New York State Theater, Lincoln Center. It was titled Variations on "I'm Old Fashioned" at its first performance,  but the name was truncated to its current form the following week.

Original cast
Judith Fugate
Kyra Nichols
Heather Watts 
Joseph Duell
Sean Lavery
Bart Cook

Reviews  
  

 
 NY Times by Alastair Macaulay, October 9, 2010

References 

  
 Repertory Week, NYCB, Spring season, 2008 repertory, week 5
 
 Playbill, NYCB, Friday, May 30, 2008

Articles 

  
Sunday NY Times, Jack Anderson, May 29, 1983 
 
NY Times, Roslyn Sulcas, May 28, 2007

Ballets by Jerome Robbins
New York City Ballet repertory
1983 ballet premieres
Ballets by Morton Gould